The year 1906 in science and technology involved some significant events, listed below.

Chemistry
 Charles Barkla discovers that each element has a characteristic X-ray and that the degree of penetration of these X-rays is related to the atomic weight of the element.
 Mikhail Tsvet first names the chromatography technique for organic compound separation, in the course of demonstrating that chlorophyll is not a single chemical compound.

Geology
 April 18 – The San Francisco earthquake, an estimated 7.9 on the Richter scale and centered on the San Andreas fault, strikes near San Francisco, California. The earthquake and fire destroy over 80% of the buildings in the city, and kill as many as 6,000 people. Harry Fielding Reid devises the elastic-rebound theory to account for earthquake mechanism.
 Richard Oldham argues that the Earth has a molten interior.

Mathematics
 Andrey Markov produces his first theories on Markov chain processes.
 Axel Thue uses the Thue–Morse sequence to found the study of combinatorics on words.

Medicine
 September – Last death from yellow fever in the Panama Canal Zone following  a mosquito eradication program led by William C. Gorgas.
 October–December – Martha Baer undergoes sex reassignment surgery to become Karl M. Baer in Germany.
 November 3 – A speech given by Alois Alzheimer for the first time presents the pathology and clinical symptoms of pre-senile dementia together; the condition will rapidly become known as Alzheimer's disease.
 BCG (Bacilli-Calmette-Guerin) immunization for tuberculosis first developed.
 Transmission of dengue fever by the Aedes mosquito is confirmed.
 Frederick Hopkins proposes the existence of vitamins and suggests that a lack of them causes scurvy and rickets.
 Charles Sherrington publishes The Integrative Action of the Nervous System.
 Clemens Peter von Pirquet, with Béla Schick, coins the term "allergy" to describe hypersensitive reactions.
 Royal Victoria Hospital, Belfast, is completed, the first such air conditioned building in the world.
 George Newman publishes Infant Mortality: a Social Problem in England.
 August von Wassermann develops a complement fixation test for the diagnosis of syphilis.

Physics
 Walther Nernst presents a formulation of the third law of thermodynamics.

Technology
 January – Lee De Forest files a patent for the Audion vacuum tube, which helps usher in the age of electronics.
 February 10 – Launch of British battleship HMS Dreadnought.
 March 18 –  At Montesson in France, Romanian inventor Traian Vuia becomes the first person to achieve an unassisted takeoff in a heavier-than-air powered monoplane, but it is incapable of sustained flight.
 October 18 – German inventor Arthur Korn demonstrates the transmission of a photograph electronically over a distance of 1800 km using his Bildetelegraph or phototelautograph system.
 December 24 – Reginald Fessenden makes the first radio broadcast, including a musical recording, a violin solo, and readings, from Brant Rock, Massachusetts.
 The first practicable gyrocompass is invented by Hermann Anschütz-Kaempfe in Germany.

Events
 November 12 – First displays of the Deutsches Museum open to the public in Munich.

Publications
 African Invertebrates begins publication as Annals of the Natal Government Museum; it will be continuing publication more than a century later.

Awards
 Nobel Prizes
 Physics – Sir J. J. Thomson
 Chemistry – Henri Moissan
 Medicine – Camillo Golgi, Santiago Ramón y Cajal
 Hughes Medal – Hertha Ayrton

Births
 January 6 – G. Ledyard Stebbins (died 2000), American botanist and geneticist.
 January 10 – Grigore Moisil (died 1973), Romanian mathematician.
 January 11 – Albert Hofmann (died 2008), Swiss chemist.
 February 3 
 George Adamson (died 1989), Indian-born wildlife conservationist.
 Ilona Banga, Hungarian biochemist (died 1998)
 February 4 – Clyde Tombaugh (died 1997), American astronomer.
 February 17 – Elizabeth M. Ramsey (died 1993), American research physician.
 February 18 – Hans Asperger (died 1980), Austrian pediatrician.
 April 28 – Kurt Gödel (died 1978), Austrian mathematician.
 June 13 – Bruno de Finetti (died 1985), Italian statistician.
 June 18 – Orvan Hess (died 2002), American obstetrician.
 June 23 – Derek Jackson (died 1982), Swiss-born British spectroscopist and steeplechase rider (also his twin brother Vivian).
 June 28 – Maria Göppert (died 1972), German-born theoretical physicist, recipient of the Nobel Prize in Physics. 
 July 2 – Hans Bethe (died 2005), German-born physicist, recipient of the Nobel Prize in Physics.
 August 19 – Philo Farnsworth (died 1971), American television pioneer.
 September 1 – Karl August Folkers (died 1997), American biochemist.
 September 4 – Max Delbrück (died 1981), German-born biologist.
 September 30 – Vera Faddeeva (died 1983), Soviet mathematician.
 October 2 – Willy Ley (died 1969), German-born scientific populariser.
 November 3 – Carl Benjamin Boyer (died 1976), American historian of mathematics.
 November 5 – Fred Lawrence Whipple (died 2004), American astronomer, coins the term "dirty snowball" to explain the nature of comets.
 November 18 – George Wald (died 1997), American scientist.
 December 9 – Grace Hopper (died 1992), American computer scientist.
 December 25 – Ernst Ruska (died 1988), German physicist, recipient of the Nobel Prize in Physics.

Deaths
 January 13 (Old Style December 31, 1905) – Alexander Stepanovich Popov (born 1859), Russian physicist.
 January 14 – Hermann Sprengel (born 1834), German-born British chemist.
 February 27 – Samuel Pierpont Langley (born 1834), American astronomer.
 March 8 – Henry Baker Tristram (born 1822), English ornithologist.
 April 19 – Pierre Curie (born 1859), French winner of the Nobel Prize in Physics.
 May 15 – James Blyth (born 1839), Scottish electrical engineer.
 July 5 – Paul Drude (born 1863), German physicist (suicide).
 September 5 – Ludwig Boltzmann (born 1844), Austrian physicist.

References

 
Science, 1906 In
20th century in science
1900s in science